Odd Bang-Hansen (9 April 1908 – 4 March 1984) was a Norwegian educator, journalist and  author.

Biography
He was born in Kristiania (now Oslo), Norway. His parents were Lauritz Bang-Hansen (1879–1960) and Astri Halvorsen (1880–1971). His father was a Lutheran  priest who was later assigned to parishes in Vadsø and Kristiansund. He  received a cand.philol. degree in 1934  from the University of Oslo.
He became an associate professor at the Oslo Commerce School (Oslo Handelsgymnasium)  in the late 1930s.

During the Occupation of Norway by Nazi Germany, he sent his wife and children to live in Stockholm. He was actively involved in the Norwegian resistance movement, making a significant effort to help Norwegian Jews out of the country. In 1943, he was  forced to re-locate  to Great Britain where he was a consultant working with British officers in support of the Norwegian  resistance. After the Liberation of Norway at the end of World War II, he was attached to  the  Labour Party  publication Arbeiderbladet (now Dagsavisen) as a film and  theater critic. He  remained at the newspaper as a journalist until his death in 1984.

He made his literary debut in 1938 with the novel Fager er studentens drøm. He wrote several children's books, including Mette og Tom i fjellet (1948), and Trapp med 9 trinn (1952). He was chairman of the Norwegian Authors' Union from 1965 to 1971.

Selected works
Mette og Tom i fjellet (1948
 Mette og Tom og bokstavene (1949)
Mette og Tom i hulen (1951)
Trapp med 9 trinn (1952)
Fly, hvite due (1953) 
Spillemann på flukt (1957)
Fra mitt spisebord (1973)

Personal life
He married the physician Elise Aas (1907–2002) in 1936. He was the father of the theatre director Kjetil Bang-Hansen (born 1940) and the film producer Pål Bang-Hansen (1937–2010).

References 

1908 births
1984 deaths
Writers from Oslo
University of Oslo alumni
Norwegian expatriates in Scotland
Norwegian resistance members
Norwegian educators
Norwegian film critics
Norwegian theatre critics
Norwegian children's writers
20th-century Norwegian novelists
20th-century Norwegian journalists